Paulina Mladinic Zorzano (born c. 1980) was the Chilean delegate for Miss World in 1997. Paulina is of Croatian and Basque descent.

References
History of Miss World Chile, 1988-2006 

Living people
Chilean female models
Chilean people of Croatian descent
Miss World Chile winners
Miss World 1997 delegates
1980s births